Narberth station may refer to:

 Narberth station (SEPTA), a SEPTA station in Narberth, Pennsylvania, US
 Narberth railway station (Wales), in Narberth, Pembrokeshire, Wales

See also
 Narberth (disambiguation)